Echinaster sepositus, the Mediterranean red sea star (sometimes only red sea star, but this name is also used for other species), is a species of starfish from the East Atlantic, including the Mediterranean Sea.

Description
Echinaster sepositus has five relatively slender arms around a small central disc. It is a bright orange-red in colour, and has a soapy surface texture unlike superficially similar Henricia starfish (another somewhat similar species from the same region is Ophidiaster ophidianus). The surface is dotted with evenly spaced pits from which the animal can extend its deep red gills (papula).

Distribution
Echinaster sepositus is found in the East Atlantic north of the Equator, including the Mediterranean Sea where it is one of the most common starfish (although virtually absent from some localities). Its northern limit is the English Channel, but only on the French side.

References

sepositus
Starfish described in 1805